The following lists events in the year 2022 in Venezuela.

Incumbents 

 President: Nicolás Maduro, Juan Guaidó (presidential crisis)
 Vice President: Delcy Rodríguez

Governors 

 Amazonas: Miguel Rodríguez
 Anzoátegui: Antonio Barreto Sira
 Apure: Ramón Carrizales
 Aragua: Rodolfo Clemente Marco Torres and Daniela González
 Barinas: Argenis Chávez
 Bolívar: Justo Noguera Pietri
 Carabobo: Rafael Lacava
 Cojedes: Margaud Godoy
 Delta Amacuro: Lizeta Hernández
 Falcón: Víctor Clark
 Guárico: José Manuel Vásquez
 Lara: Adolfo Pereira Antique
 Mérida: Ramón Guevara
 Miranda: Héctor Rodríguez
 Monagas: Yelitza Santaella and Cosme Arzolay
 Nueva Esparta: Alfredo Díaz
 Portuguesa: Rafael Calles
 Sucre: Edwin Rojas
 Táchira: Laidy Gómez
 Trujillo: Henry Rangel Silva
 Vargas: José Manuel Suárez
 Yaracuy: Julio León Heredia
 Zulia: Manuel Rosales

Events 

 25 January – Brazil and Venezuela will reopen their border after a two year closure due to the COVID-19 pandemic. 
 6 March – The United States start talks with Venezuela about supplies of its oil, currently under sanctions, in an attempt to substitute the Russian crude. So far the talks yielded few results.
 8 March – U.S. President Joe Biden announces that Venezuela has freed two Americans, Gustavo Cardenas and Jorge Fernandez, after being detained in the country.
 14 May – Venezuela announces that it will sell 5–10% shares in state-owned companies to private investors in order to help fund state enterprises.
 17 May – The United States lifts some economic sanctions on Venezuela, including allowing the Chevron Corporation to negotiate its license with the Venezuelan PDVSA state-owned oil company and removing the names of some Venezuelan officials from a United States government list of sanctioned individuals.
 25 May – Colombian and Venezuelan intelligence officials confirm the death of Miguel Botache Santillana, alias Gentil Duarte, the top leader of the FARC dissidents.
 11 June – Top oil and petrochemicals producers Iran and Venezuela sign a 20-year economic cooperation agreement.
 12 June – Authorities in Argentina seize an Iranian Boeing 747 which was transferred to Venezuela last year. It is unclear if the impound is related to sanctions that have been imposed on both countries.
 28 August – Colombia and Venezuela restore diplomatic relations after three years.
 9 October – A landslide caused by days of torrential rain kills at least 22 people in Santos Michelena.

Deaths 

 8 January – José Curiel, 84, politician, governor of Falcón (1996–2000)
 18 January – Elio Pietrini, 83, Argentine-Venezuelan actor (Abigail, Amores de fin de siglo, Destino de Mujer)
 23 January – Narciso Debourg, 96, sculptor
 25 January – Ramón Martínez, 73, politician, senator (1998–2000) and governor of Sucre (1992–1998, 2000–2008)
 26 January – Esther Alzaibar, 91, ceramic artist
 8 February – Arnaldo Arocha, 85, politician, deputy (1969–1974, 1984–1989) and twice governor of Miranda
 12 February – Gladys Guarisma, 83, linguist
 16 February –
 Américo Martín, 84, politician, deputy (1979–1984)
 José Enrique Sarabia, 81, musician and songwriter
 23 February – Ramón José Viloria Pinzón, 62, Roman Catholic prelate, bishop of Puerto Cabello (2004–2010)
 14 May – América Alonso, 85, actress
 8 August – Luis Enrique Oberto, 93, politician, member (1979–1999) and president (1990–1994) of the Chamber of Deputies, minister of finance (1972–1974)
 6 September – Tina Ramirez, 92, Venezuelan-born American dancer and choreographer

See also 

 COVID-19 pandemic in Venezuela
 Hyperinflation in Venezuela
 2022 in politics and government
 2020s
 2020s in political history

References 

 
Venezuela
Venezuela
2020s in Venezuela
Years of the 21st century in Venezuela